The 2022–23 California Baptist Lancers men's basketball team represented California Baptist University in the 2022–23 NCAA Division I men's basketball season. The Lancers, led by tenth-year head coach Rick Croy, played their home games at the CBU Events Center in Riverside, California as members of the Western Athletic Conference. This was the Lancers' first year as a full DI member, now making them eligible to qualify for the NCAA tournament.

Previous season
The Lancers finished the 2021–22 season 18–16, 7–11 in WAC play to finish in ninth place. In the WAC tournament, they defeated Texas–Rio Grande Valley in the first round, before falling to Sam Houston in the second round. They were invited to the CBI, where they lost in the first round to Middle Tennessee.

Roster

Schedule and results

|-
!colspan=12 style=""| Non-conference regular season

|-
!colspan=12 style=""| WAC regular season

|-
!colspan=9 style=| WAC tournament

|-

Sources

References

California Baptist Lancers men's basketball seasons
California Baptist Lancers
California Baptist Lancers men's basketball
California Baptist Lancers men's basketball